USS Pembina (AK-200) – later known as USNS Pembina (T-AK-200) -- was an  that was constructed for the U.S. Navy during the closing period of World War II. She supported the end-of-war Navy effort and was subsequently placed in service with the US Army under the Shipping Control Authority for the Japanese Merchant Marine with a Japanese crew in Yokosuka, Japan.

In 1951, she was returned to the Navy and served the remainder of her Navy career with the Military Sea Transportation Service. In 1968 she was again transferred to the Army as USAT Resolute and served with the Army until she was returned to the U.S. Maritime Administration and sold in 1980.

Construction
The second ship to be so named by the Navy, Pembina (AK–200) was laid down 23 June 1944, MC Hull 2154, by the Globe SB Co., Superior, Wisconsin, launched 14 October 1944; sponsored by Miss Elizabeth Mann; acquired by the Navy through the Maritime Commission 9 May 1945; and commissioned 25 May 1945.

Service history

World War II-related service
After shakedown in the Gulf of Mexico, Pembina loaded cargo at Gulfport, Mississippi, for delivery to Subic Bay, Luzon in the Philippine Islands. She sailed 21 June, arriving 10 August, and proceeded with other cargoes to Okinawa; Jinsen, Korea; and Japanese ports. After off-loading at Yokosuka, Japan 31 December, she was ordered to report to Commander Fleet Activities Yokosuka to decommission.

Temporary service with the War Department
Pembina decommissioned 26 January 1946, and was delivered to War Shipping Administration (WSA) representatives for turn over to the US War Department under loan agreement (bare boat basis). She was struck from the Naval Vessel Register 5 June.
 
Pembina operated under Shipping Control Authority for the Japanese Merchant Marine (SCAJAP), with a Japanese crew and licensed American officers. Title was transferred to the Navy on 1 July 1950. The ship had been reinstated on the Naval Vessel Register 28 June 1950. She transferred from SCAJAP via the US Army to the Navy Military Sea Transportation Service (MSTS) 1 April 1951 at Yokohama, Japan.

Assigned to the MSTS
She was assigned to the Commander MSTS Pacific Area at San Francisco, California, 17 April 1956 following service in the Western Pacific Ocean, based in Japan.

Inactivation
Pembina was placed in temporary custody of US Maritime Administration (MARAD) 18 April 1957, and assigned to the Olympia, Washington, Reserve Fleet in ready status. She was given permanent assignment to MarAd 31 March 1958, berthed at Olympia, and struck from the Naval Vessel Register the same day.

Transferred to the U.S. Army
She remained at Olympia in the National Defense Reserve Fleet until transferred to the Army 29 May 1968. Renamed USAT Resolute 19 June 1968, the cargo ship served the US Army as a transportation and training ship. In 1971 she was moved to the Rio Vista Marine Storage Activity Site in Rio Vista, California and used to train personnel in cargo handling. However, when the Army changed over to containerized cargo handling she was no longer useful for cargo or training purposes. She was returned to the US Maritime Commission's Suisun Bay Reserve Fleet on 25 January 1979. Resolute was sold by MARAD on 10 October 1980, to Coast Line Associates, L.P.

Merchant service
Resolute was renamed Kathleen Pearcy 26 October 1989, when she was sold to the Seaborne Line, Inc., her name changed again 6 August 1992, back to Pembina. In 1996 she was sold to a US-based Missionary Group called "Friendships". Renamed Spirit of Grace, the former Pembina hauled supplies and delivered aid to needy people in various part of the world. On a mission trip to Israel in 2006, Spirit of Grace burned out a cylinder in her main engine, requiring an expensive rebuild. At the same time, Friendships was offered a newer vessel of similar size, which was accepted and has been renamed Integrity. As a result, Spirit of Grace was returned to the original donor and subsequently sold to ESCO Marine in Brownsville Tx, where she was scrapped in December 2008.

Honors and awards
Qualified Pembina personnel were eligible for the following:
 American Campaign Medal
 Asiatic-Pacific Campaign Medal
 World War II Victory Medal
 Navy Occupation Service Medal (with Asia clasp)

Notes 

Citations

Bibliography 

Online resources

External links

 

Alamosa-class cargo ships
Ships built in Superior, Wisconsin
1944 ships
World War II auxiliary ships of the United States
Pembina County, North Dakota
Type C1-M ships of the United States Army